The Institute of Knowledge Transfer (IKT) is the sole accredited professional body open to all those who predominantly work in the broad and emerging profession of knowledge transfer.

History
It was established in May 2007  as an 'Institute' with approval of the UK's (previously) Department of Trade and Industry's Secretary of State's, the IKT is a not-for-profit Company By Guarantee.

Function
The objectives of the IKT are to assist in the process of turning technology, know-how, expertise and skills into innovative, commercial products and services by improving the standards of competency knowledge transfer practitioners and by stimulating the quality and provision of training.

It produces the Exchange magazine every quarter.

Structure
As with other legitimate professional bodies in the UK, membership of the IKT is recognised by the UK HM Revenue and Customs as a tax deductible expense.

It is situated on Portland Place (A4201), south of Regent's Park tube station. The IKT is based at the Institute of Physics's headquarters in London UK, but is open to members from any territory.  Membership of the IKT is also open to members from both private sector and public sectors working in roles that focus on the exchange and innovative application of knowledge.

Under the Presidency of Sir Brian Fender (Chair of BTG plc and ex Chief Executive of the Higher Education Funding Council for England), the IKT has the support of a host of existing organisations in the knowledge transfer domain (including: AIRTO, UKSPA, HEFCE, the CBI, Welsh Assembly Government, Universities UK, UK Intellectual Property Office, and ProTon Europe, amongst others).  It differs from existing organisations in this space in that it is open only to individuals that meet established competency criteria. These criteria include relevant educational qualification, relevant career and CPD and are assessed by an independent Membership and Professional Standards Committee (constituted KT professionals in the UK, North America and continental Europe).

See also
 United Kingdom Science Parks Association
 National Research Development Corporation
 Higher Education Innovation Fund

References

External links 
     Institute of Knowledge Transfer  
 The Global Innovation Network "GInnN"

Video clips
 IKT YouTube channel

Knowledge Transfer
Knowledge transfer
Organisations based in the City of Westminster
2007 establishments in the United Kingdom
Research and development in the United Kingdom
Organizations established in 2007
Innovation organizations
Institute of Physics